David Law may refer to:
David Law (cartoonist) (1908–1971), Scottish cartoonist
David Law (broadcaster) (born 1973), tennis broadcaster
David Law (golfer) (born 1991), Scottish golfer
David Jude Law (born 1972), actor
David Law (athlete), English athlete
David Law (politician), American politician

See also

David Laws (disambiguation)